The 1945–46 Segunda División season was the 15th since its establishment and was played between 23 September 1945 and 31 March 1946.

Overview before the season
14 teams joined the league, including three relegated from the 1944–45 La Liga and three promoted from the 1944–45 Tercera División.

Relegated from La Liga
Granada
Sabadell
Deportivo La Coruña

Promoted from Tercera División'''
Gimnástico
Salamanca
Real Córdoba

Teams

League table

Results

Top goalscorers

Top goalkeepers

Promotion playoffs

Relegation playoffs

External links
BDFútbol

Segunda División seasons
2
Spain